In mathematics, the Mian–Chowla sequence is an integer sequence defined
recursively in the following way. The sequence starts with

 

 

Properties
The next term in the sequence, is 2 since the pairwise sums then are 2, 3 and 4, i.e., they are distinct. Then,  can't be 3 because there would be the non-distinct pairwise sums 1 + 3 = 2 + 2 = 4. We find then that , with the pairwise sums being 2, 3, 4, 5, 6 and 8. The sequence thus begins 
1, 2, 4, 8, 13, 21, 31, 45, 66, 81, 97, 123, 148, 182, 204, 252, 290, 361, 401, 475, ... .

Similar sequences
If we define , the resulting sequence is the same except each term is one less (that is, 0, 1, 3, 7, 12, 20, 30, 44, 65, 80, 96, ... ).

History
The sequence was invented by Abdul Majid Mian and Sarvadaman Chowla.

References
 S. R. Finch, Mathematical Constants, Cambridge (2003): Section 2.20.2
 R. K. Guy Unsolved Problems in Number Theory, New York: Springer (2003)

Integer sequences